Sudanipur is a village in Phulpur town of Azamgarh district located in the state of Uttar Pradesh, India. It is almost 42 km away from Azamgarh city. This village is also referred to as Shudnipur & Sudnipur.

Notable people 

 Shaikh Shamim Ahmed  M.L.A. Bombay/Maharashtra (1980-1985), Vice President MPCC, Special Executive officer Govt. of Maharashtra

References 

Villages in Azamgarh district